Roger Wendell "Buck" Hill (February 13, 1927 – March 20, 2017) was an American jazz tenor and soprano saxophonist.

Hill began playing professionally in 1943 but held a day job as a mailman in his birthplace of Washington, D.C. for over thirty years. He played with Charlie Byrd in 1958-59, but was only occasionally active during the 1960s. He began recording extensively as a leader in the 1970s, but continued recording with others, such as an album with the Washington-area trumpeter Allan Houser in 1973.

Hill died at his home in Greenbelt, Maryland, at the age of 90.
A tribute mural, sponsored by the District of Columbia Department of Public Works MuralsDC project and donated by Snell Properties, featuring Hill playing a saxophone in his mailman uniform, was unveiled on August 27, 2019,  which Washington, DC Mayor Muriel Bowser declared “Roger Wendell Buck Hill Day” in the city. The mural, at just over 70 feet, is the tallest tribute mural in the nation's capital. It is located at 1925 14th Street, NW, on the side of the Elysium Fourteen building at the intersection of 14th and the historic U Street Corridor in northwest, DC, where noted African American artists performed from the 1920-1960s. The mural was painted by Tucson, AZ artist Joe Pagac.

Discography

As leader
 This Is Buck Hill (SteepleChase, 1978)
 Scope (SteepleChase, 1979)
 Easy to Love (SteepleChase, 1981 [1982])
 Impressions (SteepleChase, 1981 [1983])
 Buck Hill Plays Europe (Turning Point, 1982)
 Capital Hill (Muse, 1989)
 The Buck Stops Here (Muse, 1990)
 I'm Beginning to See the Light (Muse, 1991)
 Impulse (Muse, 1992)
 Northsea Festival (SteepleChase, 1997) - compiles Easy to Love and Impressions
 Uh Huh! Buck Hill, Live at Montpelier! (Jazzmont, 2000)
 Relax (Severn, 2006)

As sideman 
With Charlie Byrd
 Byrd's Word! (Riverside, 1958)
 Byrd in the Wind (Riverside, 1959)

With Shirley Horn
 Close Enough for Love (Verve, 1989)
 You Won't Forget Me (Verve, 1991)
 The Main Ingredient (Verve, 1995)
 I Remember Miles (Verve, 1998)

With Shirley Scott
 Great Scott! (Muse, 1991)

References

External links

1927 births
2017 deaths
American jazz saxophonists
American male saxophonists
Musicians from Washington, D.C.
SteepleChase Records artists
Muse Records artists
People from Greenbelt, Maryland
Jazz musicians from Maryland
American male jazz musicians
20th-century American saxophonists